This is a list of events in animation in 2014.

Events

January
 January 12: The Simpsons episode "Married to the Blob" is first broadcast, in which the couch gag is animated by Bill Plympton, the third time he has done so. In the same episode, the long-time single Comic Book Guy marries manga artist Kumiko Nakamura.

February
 February 1: The 41st Annie Awards are held.
 February 22: During the 87th Academy Awards, Frozen by Chris Buck, Jennifer Lee and Peter Del Vecho wins the Academy Award for Best Animated Feature. The song "Let It Go" from the same movie, written by Kristen Anderson-Lopez and Robert Lopez wins the Academy Award for Best Original Song. Mr. Hublot by Laurent Witz and Alexandre Espigares wins the Academy Award for Best Animated Short Film.

March
 March 9: The Simpsons episode "Diggs" is first broadcast, in which the couch gag is animated by Sylvain Chomet. The same evening, another episode, "The Man Who Grew Too Much" is first broadcast, featuring the last new speaking appearance of Edna Krabappel after Marcia Wallace's death on October 25, 2013. The character was retired after this episode.

April
 April 1: Cav Bøgelund's Våbenbrødre (Brothers in Arms), an animated short aimed at mature audiences about Danish soldiers during the Afghan War, premiers.
 April 27: The Simpsons episode, "What to Expect When Bart's Expecting" is first broadcast, in which the couch gag is animated by Michael Socha.
 April 27: Nickelodeon celebrates its 35th anniversary.

May
 May 4: The Simpsons episode "Brick Like Me" is first broadcast, in which large parts of the episode are animated in the style of Lego.

June
 In Belgium Karolien Raeymaekers makes an animated short, Oma, about her late grandmother, as her final exam for the KASK film school in Ghent. The film will be posted on Cartoon Brew later that year and win several awards.

August
 August 22: The first episode of BoJack Horseman premiered on Netflix.

September
 September 28: 
Fox replaces its Animation Domination block with a new block called Sunday Funday in move to acknowledge that an hour of the Sunday night schedule has live-action sitcoms and is no longer fully made up of animated shows.
 The Simpsons episode "Clown in the Dumps" premieres, with the couch gag being animated by Don Hertzfeldt. It had been announced months earlier that a recurring character would die. This character's identity is revealed: Hyman Krustofsky, father of Krusty the Clown.
 "The Simpsons Guy", a crossover episode between The Simpsons and Family Guy, is first broadcast.

October
 October 2: Alan Becker releases "Animator vs Animation IV" on YouTube
 October 13: Hub Network is rebranded as Discovery Family; Hasbro remains a minority partner and programs the network's daytime lineup with children's animated programs carried over from Hub Network, while its primetime lineup was replaced with reruns of non-fiction programs from Discovery Channel's library.

November
 November 2: The Simpsons episode "Opposites A-Frack" is first broadcast, guest starring Jane Fonda as Maxine Lombard.
 November 7: Disney releases Big Hero 6.
 November 9: "Simpsorama", a crossover episode between The Simpsons and Futurama, is first broadcast.

December
 December 17: Luxo Jr. and Moon Breath Beat are added to the National Film Registry.

Awards
 Academy Award for Best Animated Feature: Big Hero 6
 Academy Award for Best Animated Short Film: Feast
 Animation Kobe Feature Film Award: Puella Magi Madoka Magica: Rebellion
 Annecy International Animated Film Festival Cristal du long métrage: The Boy and the World
 Annie Award for Best Animated Feature: How to Train Your Dragon 2
 Asia Pacific Screen Award for Best Animated Feature Film: The Tale of the Princess Kaguya
 BAFTA Award for Best Animated Film: The Lego Movie
 César Award for Best Animated Film: Minuscule: Valley of the Lost Ants
 European Film Award for Best Animated Film: The Art of Happiness
 Golden Globe Award for Best Animated Feature Film: How to Train Your Dragon 2
 Goya Award for Best Animated Film: Mortadelo and Filemon: Mission Implausible
 Japan Academy Prize for Animation of the Year: The Wind Rises
 Japan Media Arts Festival Animation Grand Prize: The Wound
 Mainichi Film Awards - Animation Grand Award: Giovanni's Island

Films released

 January 16 - Meet the Pegasus (China)
 January 17:
 Bamse and the Thief City (Sweden)
 Boonie Bears: To the Rescue (China)
 The Boy and the World (Brazil)
 The Nut Job (United States, Canada, and South Korea)
 January 25 - The Idolmaster Movie: Beyond the Brilliant Future! (Japan)
 January 26 - The Jungle Book (India and United States)
 January 31 - Ikkyû san (China and Japan)
 February - Cheburashka (Japan and Russia)
 February 6 - Space Dogs 2 (Russia)
 February 7 - The Lego Movie (United States, Australia, and Denmark)
 February 8: 
 Buddha 2: Tezuka Osamu no Buddha ~Owarinaki Tabi~ (Japan)
 Gekijō-ban Tiger & Bunny -The Rising- (Japan)
 February 12 - Aunt Hilda! (France)
 February 14 - I Am Nightmare (United States)
 February 15 - Barbie: The Pearl Princess (United States)
 February 22:
 Bodacious Space Pirates: Abyss of Hyperspace (Japan)
 Giovanni's Island (Japan)
 February 25 - The Swan Princess: A Royal Family Tale (United States)
 March 4 - Leap Frog Letter Factory Adventures: The Letter Machine Rescue Team (United States)
 March 7 - Mr. Peabody & Sherman (United States)
 March 8:
 Doraemon: New Nobita's Great Demon—Peko and the Exploration Party of Five (Japan)
 Pretty Rhythm (Japan)
 March 11 - VeggieTales: Veggies in Space: The Fennel Frontier (United States)
 March 15:
 Eiga Precure All Stars New Stage 3: Eien no Tomodachi (Japan)
 Sekai-ichi Hatsukoi: Yokozawa Takafumi no Baai (Japan)
 March 17:
 Banished (Colombia)
 Pet Pals in Windland (Italy)
 March 18 - Achmed Saves America (United States)
 March 21 - Beyond Beyond (Denmark and Sweden)
 March 25 - Alpha and Omega 3: The Great Wolf Games (United States)
 April 1 - The Pirate Fairy (United States)
 April 4 - Super Three (China)
 April 9 - Pim and Pom: The Big Adventure (Netherlands)
 April 11 - Rio 2 (United States)
 April 19 - Detective Conan: Dimensional Sniper (Japan)
 April 21 - Back to L.A. (United States and Spain)
 April 26:
 Sora no Otoshimono Final: Eternal My Master (Japan)
 Tamako Love Story (Japan)
 May 17 - Mighty Raju: Rio Calling (India)
 May 23 - Postman Pat: The Movie (United Kingdom and United States)
 May 30:
 The Adventures of Sinbad 2 (China)
 Happy Little Submarines 4: Adventure of Octopus (China)
 Magic Wonderland (China)
 New Minesweepers Warfare: Courageous Boy (China)
 May 31:
 GG Bond 2 (China)
 I Am a Wolf (China)
 Space Panda 2 (China)
 June 7 - Persona 3 The Movie: Chapter 2, Midsummer Knight's Dream (Japan)
 June 12 - Mini and the Mozzies (Denmark)
 June 13 - How to Train Your Dragon 2 (United States)
 June 21:
 Lupin the IIIrd: Daisuke Jigen's Gravestone (Japan)
 Saint Seiya: Legend of Sanctuary (Japan)
 July 4 - The Predictor Paul (China)
 July 5 - Soreike! Anpanman: Ringo Bō Ya To Min'Nano Negai (Japan)
 July 10:
 Roco Kingdom 3 (China)
 Seer 4 (China)
 July 12 - K: Missing Kings (Japan)
 July 18 - Planes: Fire & Rescue (United States)
 July 19: 
 Pokémon the Movie: Diancie and the Cocoon of Destruction (Japan)
 When Marnie Was There (Japan)
 July 20 - Happy Heroes 2 Qiyuan Planet Wars (China)
 July 25 - The Magical Brush (China)
 July 29 - Iron Man & Captain America: Heroes United (United States)
 July 31 - Dragon Nest: Warrior's Dawn (China and United States)
 August 2 -  A Fairly Odd Summer (Canada and United States)
 August 5 - VeggieTales: Celery Night Fever (United States)
 August 7 - Barbie and the Secret Door (United States)
 August 8: 
 The Legend of Qin (China)
 Stand by Me Doraemon (Japan)
 Yugo & Lala 2 (China)
 August 21:
 Slugterra: Return of the Elementals (Canada)
 Snow White The Power of Dwarfs (China)
 August 22 - Rocks in My Pockets (Latvia and United States)
 August 23 - Shin Gekijō-ban Initial D (Japan)
 August 25 - The Boxcar Children (United States)
 August 29 - The Golden Horse (Lithuania)
 September - Ap Bokto (Bhutan)
 September 4:
 Ribbit (Malaysia)
 Winx Club: The Mystery of the Abyss (Italy)
 September 5 - Food War (China)
 September 6:
 The Prophet (Canada, France, Lebanon, Qatar, and United States)
 Tale of the Rally (China)
 September 9 - LeapFrog Letter Factory Adventures: Counting on Lemonade (United States)
 September 11 - Maya the Bee (Germany and Australia)
 September 13 - Gekijōban Cardfight!! Vanguard (Japan)
 September 14 - Manieggs: Revenge of the Hard Egg (Hungary)
 September 21 - Mummy, I'm a Zombie (Spain)
 September 25 - The Seventh Dwarf (Germany)
 September 26: 
 The Boxtrolls (United States)
 Secret Plans (China)
 September 27 - My Little Pony: Equestria Girls – Rainbow Rocks (United States and China)
 September 30 - Henry & Me (United States)
 October 1:
 Farm House 81 II (China)
 Kuiba 3 (China)
 Mc Dull·Me & My Mum (China)
 October 2 - Jungle Shuffle (Mexico, South Korea, and Colombia)
 October 3:
 The Frogville (Taiwan)
 The Hero of Color City (United States)
 Shi Er Sheng Xiao Cheng Shi Ying Xiong (China)
 The Stressful Adventures of Boxhead and Roundhead (Romania and United States)
 Timing (South Korea)
 October 4 - Possessed (Spain)
 October 7 - Alpha and Omega 4: The Legend of the Saw Tooth Cave (United States)
 October 8 - Triple Trouble (Netherlands)
 October 10 - Moomins on the Riviera (France and Finland)
 October 11: 
 HappinessCharge PreCure! The Movie: The Ballerina of the Land of Dolls (Japan)
 Space Battleship Yamato 2199: A Voyage to Remember (Japan)
 Uchū Senkan Yamato 2199: Hoshi-Meguru Hakobune (Japan)
 Yellowbird (France)
 October 14 - VeggieTales: Beauty and the Beet (United States)
 October 17 - The Book of Life (United States)
 October 30:
 La leyenda de las Momias (Mexico)
 The Little Medic – Secret Mission of the Bodynauts (Germany)
 November 6 - Chaar Sahibzaade (India)
 November 7 - Big Hero 6 (United States)
 November 14:
 Dwegons and Leprechauns (United States)
 Evliya Çelebi: The Fountain of Youth (Turkey)
 November 15 - Expelled from Paradise (Japan)
 November 22 - Attack on Titan Part 1: Crimson Bow and Arrow (Japan)
 November 26:
 Asterix: The Land of the Gods (France)
 Penguins of Madagascar (United States)
 November 28:
 Balgar: The Movie (Bulgaria)
 Mortadelo and Filemon: Mission Implausible (Spain)
 December 4 - 108 Demon Kings (France, Belgium, Luxembourg, Ireland, and China)
 December 6:
 Mune: Guardian of the Moon (France)
 The Last: Naruto the Movie (Japan)
 December 10 - Song of the Sea (Ireland)
 December 11 - Adventures on the Red Plane (Brazil)
 December 12:
 The Snow Queen: Journey Continues (Russia)
 Tinker Bell and the Legend of the NeverBeast (United States)
 December 13 - Aikatsu! The Movie (Japan)
 December 18: 
 Babai (Ukraine)
 Coconut, the Little Dragon (Germany)
 December 27 - Anahit (Armenia)
 December 31 - One Hundred Thousand Bad Jokes (China)
 Specific date unknown - Yume wa Hatou wo Koete – Tenmei ni Ikita Otoko: Suminokura Ryōi (Japan)

Television series debuts

{| class="wikitable sortable" style="text-align: center" width="75%"
! scope="col" | Date
! scope="col" | Title
! scope="col" | Channel
! scope="col" | Year
|-
| January 7 || Numb Chucks || YTV || 2014–16
|-
| January 9 || Go! Go! 575 || Tokyo MX || rowspan=3 | 2014
|-
| January 13 || Chozen || FX ||
|-
| January 18 || Pokémon the Series: XY || Cartoon Network
|-
| January 20 || Sheriff Callie's Wild West || Disney Junior || rowspan=2 | 2014–17
|-
| February 3 || Wallykazam! || Nick Jr.
|-
| February 12 || Mixels || Cartoon Network || rowspan=4 | 2014–16
|-
| February 17 || Breadwinners || Nickelodeon
|-
| March 12 || Nerds and Monsters || YTV
|-
| April 2 || TripTank || Comedy Central
|-
| April 9 || The Tom and Jerry Show || Cartoon Network, Boomerang || 2014–21
|-
| April 11 || Piggy Tales || Toons.TV || 2014-19
|-
| April 14 || Clarence || Cartoon Network
| rowspan=2 | 2014–18
|-
| May 2 || Space Racers || PBS Kids, Universal Kids
|-
| May 23 || Tumble Leaf || Amazon Video || 2014–19
|-
| July 7 || The 7D || Disney XD || 2014–16
|-
| July 12 || Astroblast! || Universal Kids || 2014–15
|-
| August 18 || Dora and Friends: Into the City! || Nick Jr. || 2014–17
|-
| August 22 || BoJack Horseman || Netflix || 2014–20
|-
| September 21 || Mr. Pickles || Adult Swim || 2014–19
|-
| September 22 || Jorel's Brother || Cartoon Network Brazil || 2014–22
|-
| October 3 || Star Wars Rebels || Disney XD || 2014–18
|-
| October 13 || Blaze and the Monster Machines || Nick Jr. || 2014–present
|-
| rowspan=2 | October 27 || Stone Quackers || FXX|| 2014–15
|-
| Mike Tyson Mysteries || Adult Swim || 2014–20
|-
| November 1 || Angry Birds Stella || Toons.TV || 2014-16
|-
| November 3 || Over the Garden Wall || rowspan=2 | Cartoon Network || 2014
|-
| November 8 || Sonic Boom || 2014–17
|-
| November 26 || VeggieTales in the House || Netflix || 2014–16
|-
| December 5 || Penn Zero: Part-Time Hero || Disney XD || rowspan=2 | 2014–17
|-
| December 19 || All Hail King Julien || Netflix
|}

Television series endings

Deaths

January
 January 6: Larry D. Mann, Canadian actor (voice of Yukon Cornelius in Rudolph the Red-Nosed Reindeer), dies at age 91.
 January 10: Russell Johnson, American actor (voice of Roy Hinkley in The New Adventures of Gilligan and Gilligan's Planet), dies at age 89.
 January 16: Hal Sutherland, American painter, film director and animator (Walt Disney Company, co-founder of Filmation), dies at age 84.
 January 19: Michael Sporn, American animator and film director (Doctor DeSoto, The Man Who Walked Between the Towers) and producer (Michael Sporn Animation), dies at age 67.
 January 27: Ichiro Nagai, Japanese actor, dies at age 82.
 January 30: Arthur Rankin Jr., American film director and producer (Rankin/Bass), dies at age 89.
 January 31: Don Vanderbeek, American background artist (Metro-Goldwyn-Mayer Animation, Johnny Bravo, Globehunters: An Around the World in 80 Days Adventure, Make Way for Noddy, Eight Crazy Nights, Candy Land: The Great Lollipop Adventure, The Simpsons), dies from esophageal cancer at age 64.

February
 February 2: Philip Seymour Hoffman, American actor, director and producer (voice of Max Jerry Horowitz in Mary and Max, Will Toffman in the Arthur episode "No Acting, Please"), dies from a drug overdose at age 46.
 February 12: Sid Caesar, American actor and writer (voice of King Goochi in Intergalactic Thanksgiving, Marty Kazoo in Life with Louie, Jacob in Globehunters: An Around the World in 80 Days Adventure), dies at age 91.
 February 16: Jimmy T. Murakami, American film director and animator (Toei Animation, The Snowman, The Magic Pear Tree), dies at age 80.
 February 24: Harold Ramis, American actor, (voice of Zeke in Heavy Metal), comedian, director and writer (Rover Dangerfield), dies at age 69.

March
 March 18:
 Jorge Arvizu, Mexican actor (Spanish dub voice of Bugs Bunny, Popeye, Fred Flintstone, and Magilla Gorilla, and Benny and Choo-Choo in Top Cat: The Movie), dies at age 81.
 Joe Lala, American musician and actor (voice of Mr. Estevez in The Adventures of Jimmy Neutron, Boy Genius, Hector's Dad in Ozzy & Drix, Enrique in the All Grown Up! episode "Dude, Where's My Horse?", Leonardo da Vinci in the Time Squad episode "Daddio DaVinci", additional voices in Monsters, Inc., The Twisted Tales of Felix the Cat, and The Legend of Calamity Jane), dies at age 66.
 March 27: Richard Lorenzana, American production accountant (The Simpsons, Futurama, Napoleon Dynamite), dies at age 69.

April
 April 6: Mickey Rooney, American actor (voice of Oswald the Lucky Rabbit in the mid-1930s, Santa Claus in the Rankin/Bass Productions Christmas specials, adult Tod in The Fox and the Hound, Mr. Cherrywood in The Care Bears Movie, Flip in Little Nemo: Adventures in Slumberland, himself in The Simpsons episode "Radioactive Man", and the short producer in the American Dad! episode "A Star is Reborn"), dies at age 93.
 April 29: Bob Hoskins, English actor (portrayed Eddie Valiant in Who Framed Roger Rabbit, voice of Boris in Balto), dies at age 71.

May
 May 2: Efrem Zimbalist Jr., American actor (voice of Alfred Pennyworth in the DC Animated Universe, Dr. Octopus in Spider-Man, Justin Hammer in Iron Man), dies at age 95.

June
 June 15: Casey Kasem, American actor (voice of Shaggy Rogers in Scooby-Doo, Robin in Super Friends, Cliffjumper in The Transformers), dies at age 82.
 June 23: Steve Viksten, American television writer (Rugrats, Duckman, Hey Arnold!, Recess, Higglytown Heroes, The Simpsons), and actor (voice of Oskar Kokoshka in Hey Arnold!), dies at age 53.
June 26: Wolf Koenig, Canadian film director and animator (worked for Colin Low), dies at age 86.
June 28: Meshach Taylor, American actor (voice of Cecil in The Secret of NIMH 2: Timmy to the Rescue, Doctor Harris in the Static Shock episode "Aftershock"), dies at age 67.
June 30: Bob Hastings, American actor (voice of Commissioner Gordon in the DC Animated Universe, Superboy in The Adventures of Superboy, Henry Glopp in Jeannie, D.D. in Clue Club), dies at age 89.

July
 July 6: Tô Hoài, Vietnamese writer, playwright, screenwriter, journalist and animator, dies at age 93.
 July 7: Dick Jones, American actor (voice of the title character in Pinocchio), dies at age 87.
 July 19: James Garner, American actor (voice of God in God, the Devil and Bob, Commander Rourke in Atlantis: The Lost Empire, Shazam in Superman/Shazam!: The Return of Black Adam), dies at age 86.
 July 28: James Shigeta, Japanese-American actor (voice of General Li in Mulan, Old Wanderer in the Avatar: The Last Airbender episode "The Spirit World-Winter Solstice, Part 1"), dies at age 85.

August
 August 4: Walter Massey, Canadian actor (voice of Admiral Zogal and Deathforce Officer in Space Carrier Blue Noah, Captain Perez and The Doctor in The Mysterious Cities of Gold, Papa and Dr. Nose in Adventures of the Little Koala, Uncle Henry in The Wonderful Wizard of Oz, Polluto in The Smoggies, Plato in The Little Flying Bears, Geppetto in Saban's Adventures of Pinocchio, Piers McMaster in C.L.Y.D.E., Guru Lou in Samurai Pizza Cats, Papa Beaver in Papa Beaver's Storytime, Mr. Gronkle in The Busy World of Richard Scarry, Dentist in The Little Lulu Show, Principal Herbert Haney and Mr. Marco in Arthur, Mr. Tinker in How the Toys Saved Christmas, Dr. Stewart in Lassie, Shen-Shen's Great Great Uncle in the Sagwa, the Chinese Siamese Cat episode "Wedding Day Mess", Santa Claus in Caillou's Holiday Movie, additional voices in Diplodos, Bumpety Boo, Sharky and George, The Adventures of Peter Pan, Saban's Adventures of the Little Mermaid, Bob in a Bottle, Robinson Sucroe, Animal Crackers, The Country Mouse and the City Mouse Adventures, Caillou, Patrol 03, Ripley's Believe It or Not!, For Better or For Worse, A Miss Mallard Mystery, Wunschpunsch and Tripping the Rift), dies at age 85.
 August 6: David Weidman, American animator and poster designer (UPA, Hanna-Barbera), dies at age 93.
 August 11:
 Robin Williams, American actor and comedian (portrayed himself in the SpongeBob SquarePants episode "Truth or Square", voice of Mork in Mork & Mindy/Laverne & Shirley/Fonz Hour, Genie in Aladdin, Aladdin and the King of Thieves and Great Minds Think 4 Themselves, The Kiwi in A Wish for Wings That Work, Batty Koda in FernGully: The Last Rainforest, Fender Pinwheeler in Robots, Ramón and Lovelace in Happy Feet and Happy Feet Two), commits suicide at age 63.
 Liz Holzman, American animator (Alvin and the Chipmunks), storyboard artist (Marvel Productions, Disney Television Animation, Animated Stories from the Bible, Garfield and Friends, Curious George), character designer (Disney Television Animation), prop designer (TaleSpin), art director, writer, director and producer (Warner Bros. Animation), dies from cancer at age 61.
 August 12: Lauren Bacall, American actress and voice actress (voice of Freezelda in HBO Storybook Musicals, Madame Lacroque in Madeline: Lost in Paris, The Grand Witch in Scooby-Doo! and the Goblin King, the Witch of the Waste in Howl's Moving Castle, The Grey One in Ernest and Celestine, Evelyn in the Family Guy episode "Mom's the Word"), dies at age 89.
 August 18: Don Pardo, American announcer (voice of the Announcer in Totally Minnie, himself in The Simpsons episodes "Moe Letter Blues" and "Moonshine River"), dies at age 96.

September
 September 4: Joan Rivers, American actress and comedian (narrator in The Adventures of Letterman segments in The Electric Company, and voice of Zonthara in Dave the Barbarian, Dot Matrix in Spaceballs: The Animated Series, Bubbe in Arthur, Annie Dubinsky in The Simpsons episode "The Ten-Per-Cent Solution", and herself in Shrek 2), dies at age 81.
 September 10: Richard Kiel, American actor (voice of Vladimir in Tangled), dies at age 74.
 September 16: Buster Jones, American actor (voice of Black Vulcan in Super Friends, Doc in G.I. Joe: A Real American Hero, Blaster in The Transformers, Winston Zeddemore in seasons 4-7 of The Real Ghostbusters, and Extreme Ghostbusters), dies at age 70.

October
 October 8: Heino Pars, Estonian film director, dies at age 88.
 October 9: Jan Hooks, American actress and comedian (voice of Lil in Frosty Returns, Manjula Nahasapeemapetilon in The Simpsons, Angleyne in the Futurama episode "Bendless Love", Nadine in the Game Over episode "Monkey Dearest", Mrs. Kellogg in The Cleveland Show episode "Mr. & Mrs. Brown"), dies from throat cancer at age 57.Jan Hooks obituary, liteseyfh.com; accessed October 21, 2014.
 October 14: Elizabeth Peña, American actress, writer and musician (voice of Paran Dul in Justice League and Justice League Unlimited, Rosa Santos in Maya & Miguel, Mirage in The Incredibles, Maria and Gold Digger in the Minoriteam episode "Landon in Love", Store Owner in the American Dad! episode "American Dream Factory"), dies from cirrhosis at age 55.

November
 November 1: Hugues Le Bars, French composer (Oggy and the Cockroaches), dies at age 64.
 November 2: Larry Latham, American animator, artist, producer and director (Hanna-Barbera, Disney Television Animation), dies from cancer at age 61.
 November 3: Tom Magliozzi, American radio host (voice of Click Tappet in the Arthur episode "Pick a Car, Any Car", and Click and Clack's As the Wrench Turns, Rusty Rust-eze in Cars and Cars 3) and television writer (Click and Clack's As the Wrench Turns), dies from Alzheimer's disease at age 77.
 November 4: Paul Gruwell, American animator (Hanna-Barbera, Heavy Metal, Marvel Productions, Garbage Pail Kids, Bonkers), background artist (The New Batman Adventures, Batman Beyond, Mission Hill), storyboard artist (Garbage Pail Kids, Alvin and the Chipmunks, DuckTales, Bonkers, Duckman), sheet timer (The Simpsons) and director (Garfield and Friends), dies at age 80.
 November 10: Gaetano Varcasia, Italian actor (dub voice of Mickey Mouse from 1988 to 1995), dies at age 55.
 November 28: Brumsic Brandon Jr., American comics artist and animator (worked for RCA and J.R. Bray), dies at age 87.

December
 December 11: Robert Taylor, American animator, producer, writer and film director (The Nine Lives of Fritz the Cat), dies at age 69 or 70 from COPD.
 December 13: Martha Sigall, American animator, inker and painter (Warner Bros. Cartoons), dies at age 97.
 December 14: Norman Bridwell, American author and cartoonist (creator of Clifford the Big Red Dog), dies at age 86.
 December 18: Harold M. Schulweis, American rabbi and author (special technical consultant for The Simpsons episode "Like Father, Like Clown"), dies from heart disease at age 89.
 December 22: Christine Cavanaugh, American actress, (voice of Chuckie Finster in Rugrats, Gosalyn Mallard in Darkwing Duck, Dexter in Dexter's Laboratory, Bunnie Rabbot in Sonic the Hedgehog, Oblina in Aaahh!!! Real Monsters), dies at age 51.
 December 27: Gennady Sokolsky, Russian illustrator, animator and film director (Happy Merry-Go-Round, Well, Just You Wait!, The Adventures of Lolo the Penguin), dies at age 77.
 December 29: András Erkel, Hungarian producer (Varga Studio, founder of Studio Baestarts), dies from brain cancer at age 52.
 December 31: Chris Moeller, American animator, storyboard artist (The Simpsons, Recess, King of the Hill), director (The Twisted Tales of Felix the Cat, King of the Hill) and producer (creator of Tripping the Rift''), dies from ALS at age 47.

See also
2014 in anime

References

External links 
Animated works of the year, listed in the IMDb

 
2010s in animation
2014